Jim Kimball is an American punk drummer. His former bands include noise-punk band Laughing Hyenas, Mule, and The Jesus Lizard, as well as The Denison/Kimball Trio (which contains only Kimball and fellow ex-Jesus Lizard Duane Denison). Kimball and Kevin Munro left Laughing Hyenas to form Mule with Wig's P.W. Long in the early 1990s.

He is the brother of Olympic silver medalist Bruce Kimball, who was convicted of killing two boys and injuring four others in a drunk-driving incident in 1988.

References 

American punk rock drummers
Firewater (band) members
Living people
Post-hardcore musicians
Noise rock musicians
The Jesus Lizard members
Year of birth missing (living people)
The Denison/Kimball Trio members